In order to choose an entry for the Eurovision Song Contest 1988, Sweden held a national selection, namely Melodifestivalen 1988. The runaway winner was the ballad "Stad i ljus" sung by Tommy Körberg, who also had represented Sweden at the 1969 contest. This time his song was written by Py Bäckman. It was the first time in the eighties that the Swedish entry was a ballad.

Before Eurovision

Melodifestivalen 1988
Melodifestivalen 1988 was the selection for the 28th song to represent Sweden at the Eurovision Song Contest. It was the 27th time that this system of picking a song had been used. 1,100 songs were submitted to SVT for the competition. The final was held in the Malmö Stadsteater in Malmö on 27 February 1988, presented by Bengt Grafström and was broadcast on TV2 and was not broadcast on radio. The show was watched by 4,464,000 people.

Voting

At Eurovision
Sweden performed second at the contest and received a total of 52 points and finished 12th.

Voting

References

External links
TV broadcastings at SVT's open archive

1988
Countries in the Eurovision Song Contest 1988
1988
Eurovision
Eurovision